Petar "Pedro" Goić (23 March 1896 – 19 January 1995) was a Croatian-Chilean track and field athlete who specialised in the hammer throw. He competed in the men's hammer throw at the 1936 Summer Olympics, representing Yugoslavia.

After migrating to Chile, he won the silver medal in the hammer behind Federico Kleger at the 1927 South American Championships in Athletics, before going on to best Kleger to the gold medal at the 1931 South American Championships in Athletics. Upon his return to Yugoslavia he placed ninth at the 1934 European Championships.

References

1896 births
1995 deaths
Croatian Austro-Hungarians
People from the Kingdom of Dalmatia
People from Brač
Croatian male hammer throwers
Chilean male hammer throwers
Yugoslav male hammer throwers
Olympic male hammer throwers
Olympic athletes of Yugoslavia
Athletes (track and field) at the 1936 Summer Olympics
South American Championships in Athletics winners